Matthew Rothenberg (born February 16, 1965) is an American journalist and co-author of "You're Better Than Your Job Search" with TheLadders.com CEO Marc Cenedella.

Rothenberg, the son of American poet Jerome Rothenberg, worked at MacWEEK in San Francisco, where he was reportedly author of the magazine's "Mac the Knife" rumor column and its online counterpart, The Electric Knife. He was editor-in-chief of eWeek magazine and editorial director at Hachette Filipacchi Media U.S. and currently works as editor-in-chief at TheLadders, a leading site for senior-level job seekers.

Rothenberg is credited as being the first journalist to report the existence of the Apple iPad, writing in November, 2002 that the company was working on a “large iPod with no keyboard.” He had previously broken the news that Apple would release a version of its Mac OS X for the Intel platform and Adobe’s development of InDesign, then known by the name, “K2.”

In addition to his work at TheLadders, Rothenberg is a contributing blogger to CBS MoneyWatch.

Rothenberg is also the founder of Che Underground: The Blog, which documents San Diego's underground music scene of the late '70s and early '80s.

References

Living people
1965 births
American male journalists